Omampuliyur Thuyartheertanathar Temple (ஓமாம்புலியூர் துயர்தீர்த்தநாதர் கோயில்)
 is a Hindu temple located at Omapuliyur in Cuddalore district of Tamil Nadu, India.  The historical name of the place is Umapuliyur.  The presiding deity is Shiva. He is called as Pranava Vyakrapureeswar . His consort is known as Poongodi Nayaki. The temple is one of the few temples where Dakshinamurthy is present inside the sanctum.

Significance 
It is one of the shrines of the 275 Paadal Petra Sthalams - Shiva Sthalams glorified in the early medieval Tevaram poems by Tamil Saivite Nayanars Tirugnanasambandar and Tirunavukkarasar. The temple is counted as one of the temples built on the northern banks of River Kaveri.

Nava Puliyur Temples
This is one of the Nava Puliyur Temples worshipped by Patanjali and Vyaghrapada. The following temples are called as Nava Puliyur Temples.

 Perumpatrapuliyur 
 Thirupathiripuliyur 
 Erukathampuliyur 
 Omampuliyur 
 Sirupuliyur  
 Atthippuliyur  
 Thaplampuliyur   
 Perumpuliyur 
 Kanattampuliyur

Literary mention 
Tirgnanasambandar describes the feature of the deity as: 

Tirunavukkarasar describes the feature of the deity as:

References

External links 
 
 
 

Shiva temples in Cuddalore district
Padal Petra Stalam